Robert L. Osborne High School is a public high school located north of Atlanta in Marietta, Georgia, United States. It is the oldest high school in Cobb County. It has about 2,090 students. The school mascot is the cardinal, and the school colors are red and white.

History
Established as Olive Springs Consolidated School in 1884, the building consisted of a single room serving grades one through eight.  In 1892 the school became part of the Cobb County School System and was housed in the Olive Springs Baptist Church, little is known about the history of the community school until 1919.

As a member of a faculty of only three, Robert L. Osborne became the principal of Olive Springs Community School in 1919. Over the next nine years, Osborne worked tirelessly to serve a growing population.  In 1928, the school moved from its original location at Olive Springs Baptist Church to Joyner Avenue.  As the new school opened on September 10, 1928, it employed ten teachers and served 350 students in grades one through nine. In 1936, recognizing and honoring Osborne's commitment to the community, Olive Springs School was renamed Robert L. Osborne School.

In 1938, R. L. Osborne became a fully accredited senior high school. Its first graduating class in 1939 boasted 25 members, 13 boys and 12 girls. As the school moved to its present location on Favor Road in 1962, Mr. Osborne retired.

In 2017, to prepare for the incoming Cobb Innovative Technical Academy, the old school building was demolished. For three years, students learned out of either mobile classrooms or what building where left. 

In 2020, after three years of construction, the Cobb Innovative Technical Academy was completed. This building houses Cobb County's 6th and newest magnet school.

Demographics
The demographic breakdown of the 1,984 students enrolled for 2013-14 was:
Male - 53.7%
Female - 46.3%
Native American/Alaskan - 0.2%
Asian/Pacific Islanders - 1.9%
Black - 38.5%
Hispanic - 51.1%
White - 6.9%
Multiracial - 1.4%

83.2% of the students were eligible for free or reduced lunch.

Athletics
The following sports are offered:
Football
Baseball
Boys' tennis
Girls' tennis
Boys' track
Girls' track
Cross country
Volleyball
Wrestling
Boys' basketball
Girls' basketball
Fastpitch softball
Boys' soccer
Girls' soccer

Notable alumni
 Tokumbo Abanikanda, former Southern Miss linebacker and current scout for the Atlanta Falcons
 Jason Jones, former professional baseball player (Texas Rangers)
 Todd Jones, former professional baseball player (Houston Astros, Detroit Tigers, Minnesota Twins, Colorado Rockies, Boston Red Sox, Cincinnati Reds, Philadelphia Phillies, Florida Marlins)
 K Camp, rapper, real name Kristopher Campbell

References

External links

Official website

Educational institutions established in 1928
Public high schools in Georgia (U.S. state)
Schools in Cobb County, Georgia
1928 establishments in Georgia (U.S. state)